Eagle Scout is the highest rank attainable in the Scouts BSA program division of the Boy Scouts of America (BSA). Since it was first awarded to Arthur Rose Eldred on August 21, 1912, Eagle Scout has been earned by more than two million youth. The list below includes notable recipients.

, requirements include earning at least 21 merit badges and demonstrating Scout Spirit, leadership, and service. The requirements include an Eagle Scout Service Project where the Scout must further demonstrate service and leadership. Eagle Scouts are recognized with a medal and a cloth badge that visibly recognizes the accomplishments of the Scout. Eagle Palms are a further recognition, awarded for completing additional tenure, leadership, and merit badge requirements. Typically adult volunteers who have received the Eagle award as a youth wear a smaller patch depicting a square knot.

The Distinguished Eagle Scout Award (DESA) is bestowed to Eagle Scouts for nationally renowned distinguished service in their profession and to the community for a period of at least 25 years after earning the Eagle Scout rank. Since its introduction in 1969 by the National Eagle Scout Association, the DESA has been awarded to over 2,000 Eagle Scouts.

The NESA Outstanding Eagle Scout Award (NOESA) is bestowed to Eagle Scouts who have distinguished themselves at a local-to-regional level or who have not yet met the 25-year tenure requirement to be considered for a DESA. This award was introduced in 2011.

Eagle Scouts
  Indicates recipients of the Distinguished Eagle Scout Award (DESA)
  Indicates recipients of the NESA Outstanding Eagle Scout Award (NOESA)
  indicates deceased

A

B

C

D

{{mem/estart
|ilist=

|alist=

E

F

G

H

I

J

K

L

M

N

O

P

Q

R

S

T

U

V

W

X

Y

Z

African-American Eagle Scouts
The Boy Scouts did not track the race of scouts who earned the rank of Eagle. For many years it was thought that Edgar Cunningham, who earned his rank in 1926 as a member of Troop 12 in Waterloo, Iowa in what was then Wapsipinicon Area Council, was the first black recipient of the Eagle rank.

In February 2020, it was discovered that Harry Cooper of the Kansas City Council, became an Eagle Scout in September 1920. In the Kansas City Council (now the Heart of America Council) newsletter dated 1920, Harry Cooper of Troop 92 was listed as a new Eagle Scout as of September. The newsletter lists him as the only African American Eagle Scout in Kansas City, one of only ten Eagle Scouts in Kansas City, Missouri at the time.

In March 2020, further research showed that the Eagle Scout court of honor for Hamilton Bradley of the Rome Council, was held on December 19, 1919, in Rome, New York. This makes Bradley the earliest known black Eagle Scout.

Dr. Frank "Tick" Coleman, who earned his Eagle in 1926 is one of the first four known African-American Eagle Scouts.

Incorrectly regarded as an Eagle Scout

These persons, while notable in themselves, are sometimes incorrectly listed as having earned the award:

 Henry "Hank" Aaron; retired baseball player and member of the Baseball Hall of Fame. He is a recipient of the Silver Buffalo Award. He is often thought to be an Eagle Scout because of an advertisement he did for the BSA.
 Walter Cronkite; anchorman, journalist and commentator.
 Henry Fonda; actor and Academy Award winner who was a Scout and Scoutmaster. Incorrectly noted as an Eagle Scout by his daughter.
 Harrison Ford; Life Scout and actor who played Indiana Jones, a fictional Life Scout in Indiana Jones and the Last Crusade. This part was played by River Phoenix in the film, as a younger Indiana Jones.
 Bill Gates; Life Scout and co-founder of Microsoft. He is sometimes confused with his father, William H. Gates Sr. who is a Distinguished Eagle Scout.
 Jimmy Stewart; Second Class Scout, actor, U.S. Air Force Reserve brigadier general, recipient of the Silver Buffalo Award and the Presidential Medal of Freedom. He is often thought to be an Eagle Scout because of an advertisement he did for the BSA.

See also

 Fictional Eagle Scouts
 List of Alpha Phi Omega members (Alpha Phi Omega is a coed service fraternity based on principles derived from the BSA)
 List of Scouts
 Notable Gold Award recipients (the Gold Award is the highest achievement within the Girl Scouts of the USA)
 List of highest awards in Scouting

Notes

References

Lists of award winners
Lists of men
Lists of people involved in Scouting